Oxycodone/paracetamol, sold under the brand name Percocet among others, is a fixed-dose combination of the opioid oxycodone with paracetamol (acetaminophen), used to treat moderate to severe pain.

In 2020, it was the 69th most commonly prescribed medication in the United States, with more than 10million prescriptions.

History
The United States Food and Drug Administration (FDA) first approved Percocet in 1976, under application ANDA 085106.

Society and culture

Implicated in deaths 
In June 2009, an FDA advisory panel recommended that Percocet, Vicodin, and every other combination of acetaminophen with narcotic analgesics be limited in their sales because of their contributions to an alleged 400 acetaminophen-related deaths in the U.S. each year, that were attributed to acetaminophen overdose and associated liver damage.

In December 2009, the Canadian Medical Association Journal reported a study finding a fivefold increase in oxycodone-related deaths in Ontario (mostly accidental) between 1991 and 2007 that led to a doubling of all opioid-related deaths in Ontario over the same period.

In March 2017, U.S. President Donald Trump initiated the Opioid and Drug Abuse Commission.
In July 2017, a draft report was published. Some excerpts:
As we have all seen, opioids are a prime contributor to our addiction and overdose crisis. In 2015, nearly two-thirds of drug overdoses were linked to opioids like Percocet, OxyContin, heroin, and fentanyl. [...] Americans consume more opioids than any other country in the world. In fact, in 2015, the amount of opioids prescribed in the U.S. was enough for every American to be medicated around the clock for three weeks.

Since 1999, the number of opioid overdoses in America have quadrupled according to the CDC. Not coincidentally, in that same period, the amount of prescription opioids in America have quadrupled as well. This massive increase in prescribing has occurred despite the fact that there has not been an overall change in the amount of pain Americans have reported in that time period. We have an enormous problem that is often not beginning on street corners; it is starting in doctor's offices and hospitals in every state in our nation. [...]

In 2016, specific states witnessed an escalating number of overdose deaths due to heroin and/or fentanyl(s), in some states vastly exceeding deaths due to prescription opioids.

In 2015, 27 million people reported current use of illegal drugs or abuse of prescription drugs. Despite this self-reporting, only 10 percent of the nearly 21 million citizens with a substance use disorder (SUD) receive any type of specialty treatment according to the most recent National Survey on Drug Use and Health. This is contributing greatly to the increase of deaths from overdose.

References

External links 
 

Combination analgesics
Hepatotoxins